Make It Happen is a 1967 album by Smokey Robinson & the Miracles. It featured ballads such as the hit singles "The Love I Saw in You Was Just a Mirage" and "More Love", as well as the up-tempo "The Tears of a Clown" co-written by Stevie Wonder and his producer Hank Cosby.

Three years after the album's release, "The Tears of a Clown" was issued as a single, and charted at #1 on both the Billboard Hot 100 and UK Singles Chart. As a result, Make It Happen was reissued as The Tears of a Clown in 1970.

Stevie Wonder was a contributing writer on three of the album's songs, the aforementioned "The Tears of a Clown", "After You Put Back the Pieces (I'll Still Have a Broken Heart)", and "My Love Is Your Love (Forever)". Holland-Dozier-Holland contributed the good-times dance song "It's a Good Feeling". Smokey's fellow Miracles Warren "Pete" Moore and Marv Tarplin collaborated with him on the songs "You Must Be Love" (a popular regional hit tune), and "The Love I Saw in You Was Just a Mirage" (a Top 20 Hit) respectively, and all of The Miracles (except Claudette) co-wrote the up-tempo rocker "Dancing's Alright". The album also features a rendition of  Little Anthony & The Imperials' 1964 Top 20 smash, "I'm on the Outside (Looking In)"  "The Tears of a Clown" on the monaural version of the album has an alternate lead vocal.

Critics at Allmusic praised the album, giving it 4-1/2 out of five stars, calling it "The most underrated Miracles LP of the '60s", and stating that, in addition to the album's three hits, it also had "featured a spate of [other] great songs, including three or four that really should've been hits".

Track listing

Side one
 "The Soulful Shack" (Smokey Robinson)
 "The Love I Saw in You Was Just a Mirage" (Robinson, Marvin Tarplin)
 "My Love for You" (Clarence Paul, Morris Broadnax)
 "I'm on the Outside (Looking In)" (Bob Weinstein, Teddy Randazzo)
 "Don't Think It's Me" (Robinson)
 "My Love Is Your Love (Forever)" (Ivy Jo Hunter, Stevie Wonder)

Side two
 "More Love" (Robinson)
 "After You Put Back the Pieces (I'll Still Have a Broken Heart)" (Paul, Broadnax, Wonder)
 "It's a Good Feeling" (Holland-Dozier-Holland)
 "You Must Be Love" (Robinson, Warren Moore)
 "Dancing's Alright" (Robinson, Tarplin, Moore, Robert Rogers, Ronald White)
 "The Tears of a Clown" (Robinson, Wonder, Henry Cosby)

Personnel

The Miracles
 Smokey Robinson – lead vocals, producer, album executive producer
 Ronnie White – backing vocals
 Bobby Rogers – backing vocals
 Warren "Pete" Moore – backing vocals
 Claudette Robinson – backing vocals
 Marv Tarplin – producer, guitar

Other instruments
 The Funk Brothers and various Los Angeles session musicians: instrumentation
 The Andantes – additional backing vocals on "It's a Good Feeling"

Producers
 Brian Holland –  producer
 Lamont Dozier –  producer
 Henry Cosby – producer

References

1967 albums
The Miracles albums
Tamla Records albums
Albums produced by Smokey Robinson
Albums produced by Henry Cosby
Albums produced by Brian Holland
Albums produced by Lamont Dozier
Albums recorded at Hitsville U.S.A.